The men's 50 metre butterfly S5 event at the 2012 Paralympic Games took place on 7 September, at the London Aquatics Centre.

Three heats were held, each with seven swimmers. The swimmers with the eight fastest times advanced to the final.

Heats

Heat 1

Heat 2

Heat 3

Final

References

Swimming at the 2012 Summer Paralympics